Clifty Wilderness is a  wilderness area located in the U.S. state of Kentucky.  It was designated wilderness in 1985 and is managed by the Cumberland Ranger District of the Daniel Boone National Forest.

Located within the Red River Gorge Geological Area, Clifty Wilderness is a rugged area characterized by high cliffs, steep valleys, numerous sandstone arches, rock shelters, and boulder-strewn creeks.

The Wilderness contains at least 15 sensitive, rare or endangered plant species among more than 750 different flowering plants and 170 species of moss.

Wild and Scenic River

See also
 List of U.S. Wilderness Areas
 Wilderness Act
 Beaver Creek Wilderness

References

External links
 Clifty Wilderness - Daniel Boone National Forest
 Clifty Wilderness - Wilderness.net
 Clifty Wilderness - GORP
 KYwilderness.com

Wilderness areas of Kentucky
IUCN Category Ib
Protected areas of Menifee County, Kentucky
Protected areas of Wolfe County, Kentucky
Daniel Boone National Forest
Protected areas established in 1985
1985 establishments in Kentucky